Leopold III of Austria may refer to:

Leopold III, Margrave of Austria, the Saint (1050–1136), Margrave of Austria from the house of Babenberg
Leopold III, Duke of Austria, (1351–1386), Duke of Styria, Carinthia, Tyrol, and Vorderösterreich of House of Habsburg, died in Battle of Sempach

See also 
Leopold III (disambiguation)
List of rulers of Austria
Habsburg